This article is about the mass media in Cape Verde including its telecommunications, television and radio.

Telecommunications

In 2011, there were approximately 73,000 main line telephones and 500,000 mobile and cellular phones in use in Cape Verde, cellular phones was nearly one per person.

Television and radio

There are three television stations in Cape Verde, one state owned (RTC - TCV) and three foreign owned, RTI Cabo Verde launched by the Portuguese-based RTI in 2005, on March 31, 2007, Record Cabo Verde, its own version was launched by the Brazilian-based Rede Record. and TIVER. Cape Verde has now received TV CPLP and some of its programs are broadcast, the network first aired in 2016.  Premium channels includes the Capeverdean versions of Boom TV and Zap Cabo Verde, two channels owned by Brazil's Record.  Other premium channels are aired in Cape Verde especially on satellite networks, they are common in hotels and villas but availability is predominantly limited, one of them is RDP África, the African version of the Portuguese radio station RDP.
 
The media is operated by the Capeverdean News Agency (secondarily as Inforpress).

Nationwide radio stations include RCV, RCV+, Radio Kriola, the religious station Radio Nova.  Local radio stations include Rádio Praia, the first radio station in Cape Verde, Praia FM, the first FM station in the nation, Rádio Voz de Ponta d'Água of North Praia and Radio Morabeza in Mindelo.

Radio stations formerly existed included  and Rádio Clube do Mindelo which later became Rádio Barlavento which  existed until 1975, it was later replaced with Rádio Voz de São Vicente and became part of RCV.

Internet
Internet providers and search providers in Cape Verde include SAPO CV and recently Google.

Print

Horizonte is a daily newspaper. The government-run Novo Jornal-Cabo Verde is published twice weekly. Weekly periodicals include A Semana, Expresso das Ilhas, Jornal Horizonte, Terra Nova, Boletim Informativo , A Nação, founded in 2007 and A Voz founded in 2013.  Today, many of these national level newspaper sites are also available online (some with subscription). Regional newspapers includes Jornal O Cidadão (São Vicente), Artiletra (São Vicente), a bi-monthly newspaper/periodical, Jornal de São Nicolau and Oceanpress (Sal). Newspapers are written in the official language, Portuguese. Some such as A Semana and Jornal Horizonte has some articles written in Cape Verdean Creole. Newspapers, especially online are also written in English, some newsstands offers English language papers and rarely French especially at touristic areas of the islands of Sal and Boa Vista.  The first English language papers were first written in the late-19th century but were rarely common, most of them were available in Mindelo, São VIcente which were one of the most coal refueling stopovers in West Africa. Online, recently some articles on A Semana is also available in English.

There are also online national level newspapers and news sources, sports-oriented news sources available includes Criolosport and recently Sports Mídia.

Others including the airline magazine of TACV Fragata.

History
In the colonial area, there was a journal that was like a newspaper, the first was Boletim Oficial de Cabo Verde (Official Bulletin of Cape Verde) which first published on 24 August 1842 on the island of Boa Vista. Second came Independente on 1 October 1877 in Praia, Santiago, third came O Correio de Cabo Verde (Cape Verde Post) on 19 April 1879 and fourth came Echo de Cabo Verde (Echo of Cape Verde, Modern Portuguese: Eco de Cabo Verde) first published in April 1880. Mindelo made journals included Revista de Cabo Verde and Liberdade, both started in 1889.

In Praia, there were journals including O Povo Praiense, first made on 13 July 1886, O Praiense made in 1889 and later Praia made in the same year.

One of the recent was named Notícias de Cabo Verde (News from Cape Verde) and Jornal de Cabo Verde (Cape Verde Journal) during the mid 20th century, started publishing in 1931 and the newer O Eco de Cabo Verde (Echo of Cape Verde).

Freedom of speech
The Constitution of Cape Verde provides for free expression, and the government is said to uphold this right generally. Government authorization is not needed to establish newspapers, other printed publications, or electronic media.

Online newspapers abroad
One media based abroad is VozDiPovo-Online, an online newspaper founded in 2004 and is based in Aveiro, Portugal and serves the Capeverdean community there.

See also
 Telecommunications in Cape Verde
 Cinema of Cape Verde
 Literature of Cape Verde

References

Bibliography
  (Includes information about newspapers, radio, etc.)
 
 Fernando Cristóvão (Hrsg.): Dicionário Temático da Lusofonia. Texto Editores, Lissabon/Luanda/Praia/Maputo 2006 , p. 541
 João Nobre de Oliveira: A Imprensa Cabo-Verdiana 1820–1975, Fundação Macau, Macau 1998

External links
 

 
Cape Verde
Cape Verde